Judge Mahoney may refer to:

J. Daniel Mahoney (1931–1996), judge of the United States Court of Appeals for the Second Circuit
John Christopher Mahoney (1882–1952), judge of the United States Court of Appeals for the First Circuit
Pat Mahoney (1929–2012), Canadian judge of the Federal Court of Appeal
Paul Mahoney (English judge) (born 1946), British judge of the European Court of Human Rights